Laàs is a commune in the Pyrénées-Atlantiques department in south-western France.

Neighbouring villages include Orriule to the north, Andrein to the north-west, Narp to the east, Barraute-Camu to the west, and Montfort to the south.

The town is notable for its self-declared secession from France as the Principality of Laàs en Béarn.

Principality of Laàs
The Principality of Laàs en Béarn is an initiative of the mayor of Laàs, Jacques Pédehontaà. He first proposed the idea in August 2011 to protest against the administrative reforms of the French government.

As of May 2014, the principality is registered as a non-profit association in the Prefecture of Pau. In August 2014 it presented three animation projects, including a Hollywood Walk of Fame-like boulevard.

The Principality officially declared its independence on 1 January 2015.

See also
Communes of the Pyrénées-Atlantiques department

External links 
 Official website of the Principality of Laàs
 Facebook page of the Principality of Laàs

References

Communes of Pyrénées-Atlantiques
Béarn
Secessionist towns and cities